Illichivets Indoor Sports Complex was an indoor sporting arena that is located in the Primorsky district of Mariupol, Ukraine. It was opened on 9 May 2007.

General information 

The sports complex was built by the Mariupol Metallurgical Plant and was the largest indoor stadium in Ukraine. The arena seating has capacity for 5,500 spectators.

The complex included a football field with artificial turf (105x68m), wrestling hall (24x15m), boxing hall (24x15m), multi-functional halls for volleyball and basketball (30x18m), a table tennis hall (18x19m) and a gym. There were three outdoor tennis courts with artificial turf, a press center and auxiliary rooms. The complex was also equipped with an autonomous boiler room, energy complex, sewage treatment plant, a fire station, and a state-of-the-art air ventilation system.

The tennis hall accommodated amenities with separate locker rooms, shower and toilets facilities. 

In April 2022 during the Siege of Mariupol, the complex was reported to have been destroyed.

Sporting events 
 It has hosted the home games of FC Avanhard Kramatorsk of the Ukrainian First League.
 In 2018, the complex hosted a football match in the Ukrainian First League.

Gallery

See also

 List of football stadiums in Ukraine

References

External links

(Sport Complex "Illichivets") 

Indoor arenas in Ukraine
Sport in Mariupol
Sports venues in Donetsk Oblast
Basketball venues in Ukraine
Football venues in Donetsk Oblast
Former buildings and structures in Ukraine
Sports venues completed in 2007
Sports venues demolished in 2022
2007 establishments in Ukraine
2022 disestablishments in Ukraine
Buildings and structures destroyed during the 2022 Russian invasion of Ukraine